Yakurino is a rural locality (a village) in Spasskoye Rural Settlement, Tarnogsky District, Vologda Oblast, Russia. The population was 19 as of 2002.

Geography 
Yakurino is located 25 km northwest of Tarnogsky Gorodok (the district's administrative centre) by road. Filimonovskaya is the nearest rural locality.

References 

Rural localities in Tarnogsky District